Kuniyoshi (written: 国吉 or 國吉) is a Japanese surname. Notable people with the surname include:

Fumio Kuniyoshi (国吉 史生, born 1985), Japanese-German rapper
, Japanese footballer
, American painter and photographer
, Japanese baseball player

Kuniyoshi (written: 邦嘉, 邦佳, 邦栄, 國義 or 國芳) is also a masculine Japanese given name. Notable people with the name include:

, Japanese mixed martial artist
, Japanese painter, illustrator and photographer
, Japanese educational theorist and publisher
, Japanese scientist
, Japanese daimyō
, Japanese artist in woodblock printing and painting
 Prince Kuni Kuniyoshi (1873–1929), member of the Japanese imperial family and field marshal in the Imperial Japanese Army

References

Japanese-language surnames
Japanese masculine given names